Savannah Sunrise is a 2016 American comedy film directed by Randall Stevens and starring Shawnee Smith, Pamela Reed, Clare Carey and Shawn Christian.

Cast
Shawnee Smith as Joy
Pamela Reed as Loraine
Shawn Christian as Phil
Clare Carey as Angie
Madelyn Cline as Willow
Vitaly Andrew LeBeau as Ryan

Production
The film was shot in Augusta, Georgia and Indian Land, South Carolina.  Principal photography wrapped in late March 2016.

Reception
Barbara Shulgasser-Parker of Common Sense Media awarded the film one star out of five.

References

External links
 
 

American comedy films
Films shot in Georgia (U.S. state)
Films shot in South Carolina
2010s English-language films
2010s American films